Serras da Desordem is a 2006 Brazilian film directed by Andrea Tonacci. The film reproduces the trajectory of Carapirú, an Awá-Guajá Indian, who sees his tribe invaded and massacred by farmers and loggers. Serras da Desordem won the best film, direction and cinematography awards at the Gramado Film Festival.

References

External links 
Serras da Desordem on IMDb

2006 films
Brazilian drama films
Docudrama films
Best Picture APCA Award winners
2006 drama films